The 2016 The Summit League men's soccer season was the 11th season of men's varsity soccer in the conference.

The Denver Pioneers are both the defending regular season and conference tournament champions.

Changes from 2015 

 None

Teams

Stadiums and locations 

 North Dakota State, South Dakota and South Dakota State do not sponsor men's soccer

Regular season

Results

Rankings

Postseason

Summit League tournament

NCAA tournament

All-Summit League awards and teams

See also 
 2016 NCAA Division I men's soccer season
 2016 The Summit League Men's Soccer Tournament
 2016 The Summit League women's soccer season

References 

 
2016 NCAA Division I men's soccer season